Henzeni (also Romanized as Henzenī; also known as Henzenī-ye Pā’īn) is a village in Haviq Rural District, Haviq District, Talesh County, Gilan Province, Iran. At the 2006 census, its population was 806, in 191 families.

References 

Populated places in Talesh County